The Duluth White Sox were a minor league baseball team based in Duluth, Minnesota, that played from 1903 to 1916, and in 1934. The team played in the Northern League (1903–1905, 1908, 1913–1916, 1934), Northern-Copper Country League (1906–1907), Minnesota–Wisconsin League (1909–1911) and Central International League (1912). When professional baseball returned to Duluth in 1934 after 18 years, the name White Sox was used for one season before the team became the Duluth Dukes. The team played its home games at Athletic Park.

League championships
Northern League -- 1904, 1905, 1914
Minnesota–Wisconsin League -- 1909
Central International League -- 1912

Major League players
1903 -- Hank Gehring, Lee Quillin
1904 -- Art Ball, Hank Gehring, Joe Koukalik, Frank Martin, Lee Quillin, Newt Randall
1905 -- Cy Neighbors
1906 -- Frank Moore
1907 -- None
1908 -- Jack Ness, Larry Pratt
1909 -- Dave Bancroft, Hooks Dauss, Don Marion, Otto Miller
1910 -- George Anderson, Hooks Dauss, Don Marion
1911 -- Elmer Miller, Gene Woodburn
1912 -- Red Bluhm, Elmer Miller
1913 -- Elmer Miller, Hank Schreiber, Elmer Smith
1914 -- George Cunningham, Harry Wolfe
1915 -- Harry Wolfe
1916 -- Rube Ehrhardt, Hank Schreiber, Bill Webb, Frank Withrow, Harry Wolfe
1934 -- None

National Baseball Hall of Fame players
Dave Bancroft -- played for the White Sox briefly in 1909 before moving on to the Superior Drillers, also in the Minnesota–Wisconsin League.

Other notable players
Frank Lausche -- Ohio politician played for the White Sox in 1916. He was a Mayor of Cleveland, Governor of Ohio, and United States Senator.

References

Baseball teams established in 1903
Defunct minor league baseball teams
Professional baseball teams in Minnesota
Defunct baseball teams in Minnesota
Baseball teams disestablished in 1934
Northern League (1902-71) baseball teams
Sports in Duluth, Minnesota